
Taina may refer to:

People

Women
 Taina Asili, Puerto Rican musician, filmmaker and activist
 Taïna Barioz (born 1988), French alpine skier
 Taina Bien-Aimé, Swiss social activist
 Taina Bofferding (born 1982), Luxembourgish politician, Minister of the Interior and of Equality between Men and Women
 Taína Caragol, American art historian, author, and curator.
 Taina Elg (born 1930), Finnish-American actress and dancer
 Taina Impiö (born 1956), Finnish former cross-country skier
 Taina Kolkkala (born 1976), Finnish retired javelin thrower
 Tainá Müller (born 1982), Brazilian actress
 Tainá Paixão (born 1991), Brazilian basketball player
 Taina Salmia (born 1962), Finnish competitor in the 1985 World Allround Speed Skating Championships for women
 Anneli Taina (born 1951), Finnish politician
 Taína (model), Puerto Rican model Noris Díaz Pérez (born 1975)

Men
 Taïna Adama Soro (born 1981), Ivorian former footballer

Entertainment
 Taina (TV series), an American sitcom
 The Tainá trilogy, a series of movies comprising:
 Tainá: An Adventure in the Amazon
 Tainá 2: A New Amazon Adventure
 Tainá 3: The Origin
 Caveira (Rainbow Six Siege), Taina "Caveira" Pereira, a player character in several video games
 A fictional kingdom in the 1999 novel Enchantment by Orson Scott Card

See also
 Taíno (disambiguation)

Finnish feminine given names